The 2015–16 SLC men's basketball season was the 53rd season of Southland Conference basketball, taking place between November 2015 and March 2016.  Practices began in October 2015, and the season ended with the 2016 Southland Conference men's basketball tournament.

Preseason

Preseason Polls

Coaches Poll

Sports Information Directors' Poll

Preseason All-Conference Teams
Source:

Southland Conference Preseason Player of the Year: Thomas Walkup, Stephen F. Austin

Regular season

Head coaches

Note: Stats shown are before the beginning of the season. Overall and SLC records are from time at current school.

Postseason

Southland Conference tournament

  March 9–12, 2016: Southland Conference Men's Basketball Tournament, Leonard E. Merrill Center, Katy, Texas

NCAA tournament

The winner of the conference tournament will be awarded an automatic bid to the NCAA Division I Basketball Tournament.

National Invitation tournament

College Basketball Invitational

CollegeInsider.com Postseason tournament

Awards and honors

Regular season

SLC Player-of-the-Week

 Nov. 16 – Jalan West (Northwestern State)
 Nov. 23 – Thomas Walkup (Stephen F. Austin)
 Nov. 31 – Rashawn Thomas (Texas A&M-Corpus Christi)
 Dec. 7  – Rashawn Thomas (Texas A&M-Corpus Christi)
 Dec. 14 – Rashawn Thomas (Texas A&M-Corpus Christi)
 Dec. 21 – Jontrell Walker (Incarnate Word)
 Dec. 28 – Ja'Donte' Frye (Nicholls)
 Jan. 4  – Anthony Odunsi (Houston Baptist)
 Jan. 11 – Rashawn Thomas (Texas A&M-Corpus Christi)
 Jan. 18 – Rashawn Thomas (Texas A&M-Corpus Christi)
 Jan. 25 – Demetrious Floyd (Stephen F. Austin)
 Feb. 1  – Kevin Hill (University of New Orleans)
 Feb. 8  – Jordan Howard (Central Arkansas)
 Feb. 15 – Zeek Woodley (Northwestern State)
 Feb. 22 – 
 Mar. 1  –

Postseason

SLC All-Conference Teams and Awards

References